Kenji Tomura (戸村 健次, born August 20, 1987) is a Japanese professional baseball pitcher for the Tohoku Rakuten Golden Eagles in Japan's Nippon Professional Baseball.

External links

NPB.com

1987 births
Japanese baseball players
Living people
Nippon Professional Baseball pitchers
Rikkyo University alumni
Baseball people from Saitama Prefecture
Tohoku Rakuten Golden Eagles players